Rawls Hotel, at 116 S. Main St. in Enterprise, Alabama, was built in 1903 and was expanded in 1923.  It was listed on the National Register of Historic Places in 1980.

It is a brick building, with the brick being load-bearing, and is stucco-faced, and has "Spanish Mission" style. It was built by contractor John D.C. McKinnon. The 1928 section is a three-story, U-shaped  portion facing Railroad Street and the train depot. The original section was altered somewhat in the 1928 renovation. It has a "raised, stepped, curvilinear parapet with cement coping painted a rich brown" hiding its flat roof.

The building was deemed significant "as one of the most elaborate buildings in Coffee County. Constructed by Japenth Rawls about 1903 and remodeled and enlarged by his nephew, Jesse P. Rawls, in [1928], it is located across from the train station (NRHP 8-7-74) and has served as a landmark and central meeting place for the citizens of Enterprise. The building is also significant for its associations with the Rawls -- a family which was important in the early growth and prosperity of the city. The elder Rawls was involved in the development of the turpentine industry in Coffee County, while his nephew built and financed the first electric system in Enterprise and operated one of the largest and oldest mills in the city. It was, however, the railroad, whose station the hotel served, that gave the town its major economic stimulus."

References

National Register of Historic Places in Coffee County, Alabama
Mission Revival architecture in Alabama
Buildings and structures completed in 1903